Frederick Philipse (1626–1702), was a Dutch immigrant to North America, was first Lord of Philipsburg  Manor, New York

Frederick Philipse may also refer to:
Frederick Philipse II (c. 1698–1751), colonial American merchant, landowner, and politician
Frederick Philipse III (1720–1785), third and last Lord of Philipsburg Manor

See also
Frederick Phillips (disambiguation)
Philipse family, a prominent Dutch family in Colonial America